"Tenia tanto que darte" (I Had a Lot to Give You) is a number-one single by Spanish band Nena Daconte. Released in August 2008, on November of that same year, "Tenia tanto que darte" reached number one in the Spanish charts.

References

2008 songs
Nena Daconte songs
Number-one singles in Spain